Boubacar Fofana (born 7 September 1998) is a French professional footballer who plays as a winger for Servette.

Career
Fofana began playing football locally with Champs-sur-Marne, and moved to Bastia and Torcy before beginning his senior career with Épinal in 2017. On 14 January 2019, Fofana joined Olympique Lyonnais for 4 years and immediately went on loan to Gazélec Ajaccio.

Fofana made his professional debut for Gazélec Ajaccio in a 1–1 Ligue 2 tie with Chamois Niortais on 23 April 2019.

Personal life
Born in France, Fofana is of Malian descent.

References

External links
 
 

Living people
1998 births
Footballers from Seine-et-Marne
French footballers
French sportspeople of Malian descent
Association football wingers
Olympique Lyonnais players
Gazélec Ajaccio players
SAS Épinal players
Ligue 2 players
Championnat National 2 players
Swiss Super League players
French expatriate footballers
French expatriate sportspeople in Switzerland
Expatriate footballers in Switzerland